Jader Barbosa da Silva Gentil (born 24 July 2003), simply known as Jader, is a Brazilian footballer who plays as a forward for Atlético Nacional.

Club career
Born in Rondonópolis, Mato Grosso, Jader joined Athletico Paranaense's youth setup in 2016. He made his first team – and Série A – debut on 22 August 2021, coming on as a second-half substitute for David Terans in a 0–1 home loss against Corinthians.

Career statistics

Honours
 Athletico Paranaense
 Copa Sudamericana: 2021

References

External links
Athletico Paranaense profile 

2003 births
Living people
Sportspeople from Mato Grosso
Brazilian footballers
Association football forwards
Campeonato Brasileiro Série A players
Campeonato Paranaense players
Club Athletico Paranaense players